Arguni (Argoeni) is a minor Austronesian language of the north coast of the Bomberai Peninsula in western New Guinea.

References

External links
 Audio recording of Arguni (at YouTube)
 Subject markers in Arguni

Languages of Indonesia
Central Malayo-Polynesian languages